Konstantinos Barbas (born 22 April 1983) is a Greek footballer who plays for Gamma Ethniki club Agrotikos Asteras as a centre back.

Career
Kostas started his career in Iraklis where he stated for two season after being promoted from the youth system of Iraklis but he didn't achieve any performance with the club. In July 2003, Agrotikos Asteras signed Kostas on a free transfer. He stayed in the team for five years and he performed in one hundred thirty nine matches, while he scored eight goals. In July 2008 Kostas moved on a free transfer to Kavala where he stayed for one season but being a team regular as he played in twenty three games and scored two goals. The following season, he would return in Agrotikos Asteras again as a team regular. In summer of 2010 Veria signed Kostas Barbas for three years. Last summer he renewed his contract till 2014.

On 21 May 2014, Kostas Barbas left Veria as his contract expired.

Honours

Veria
Football League: Runner-up: 2011-12

Kavala
Football League: Third Placed: 2008-09

Agrotikos Asteras 
Football League 2: 2005-06

References

External links
 

1983 births
Living people
Greek footballers
Super League Greece players
Iraklis Thessaloniki F.C. players
Kavala F.C. players
Agrotikos Asteras F.C. players
Veria F.C. players
Olympiacos Volos F.C. players
Association football defenders
Footballers from Thessaloniki